The Cleveland Squash Classic 2014 is the women's edition of the 2014 Cleveland Classic, which is a tournament of the WSA World Tour event International (Prize money : 50 000 $). The event took place at the Cleveland Racket Club in Cleveland, Ohio in United States from 30 January to 4 February. Nicol David won her second Cleveland Classic trophy, beating Annie Au in the final.

Prize money and ranking points
For 2014, the prize purse was $50,000. The prize money and points breakdown is as follows:

Seeds

Draw and results

See also
Cleveland Classic
WSA World Tour 2014

References

External links
WSA Cleveland Classic 2014 website
Cleveland Classic 2014 Squashsite website

Women's Cleveland Classic
Cleveland Classic
Cleveland Classic
Cleveland Classic
Cleveland Classic
Cleveland Classic